Nerita is a genus of medium-sized to small sea snails with a gill and an operculum, marine gastropod molluscs in the subfamily Neritinae  of the family Neritidae, the nerites.

This is the type genus of the family Neritidae.

Distribution and habitat
Species of Nerita can be found worldwide in tropical waters in the middle and upper intertidal zones. They are gregarious herbivores.

Description
The thick shell is broadly ovate or globular and low-spired. It has a smooth surface.  The shells are spirally ribbed or show some axial sculpturing. The ventral side has a large columellar callus or parietal wall. The callus shows small pustules. The aperture and the edge of the columella are usually dentate with fine or robust teeth. The calcareus operculum is thick and can be smooth or with a granular structure. The whorls are covered with strong spiral cords.

Taxonomy
Several subgenera have been proposed over the course of time, but various authors in the past could not agree on the placement of many species. The subgeneric placement of the species of Nerita was revised by Vermeij in 1984. However, inconsistencies still remain over the use and validity of many taxonomic names, because species show a wide variety of colors, patterns and even details of shell morphology, which has given rise to many synonyms.

Species

Species within the genus Nerita include:

 Nerita adenensis Mienis, 1978
 Nerita albicilla Linnaeus, 1758
 Nerita alveolus Hombron & Jacquinot, 1848
 Nerita antiquata Récluz, 1841
 Nerita apiata Récluz, 1843  
 Nerita argus Récluz, 1841
 Nerita ascensionis Gmelin, 1791 
 Nerita aterrima Gmelin, 1791
 Nerita atramentosa Reeve, 1855
 Nerita balteata Reeve, 1855: probably congeneric with Nerita articulata 
 Nerita chamaeleon Linnaeus, 1758
 Nerita chlorostoma Lamarck, 1816
 Nerita costata Gmelin, 1791
 Nerita costulata von dem Busch, 1844
 † Nerita craigi Symonds, Gain & Belliard, 2017 
 Nerita dombeyi Récluz, 1841
 Nerita eichhorsti Krijnen, Gras & Vink, 2018
 Nerita ellyptica Le Guillou, 1841 
 Nerita erythrostoma Eichhorst & Neville, 2004 
 Nerita essingtoni Récluz, 1842
 Nerita exuvia Linnaeus, 1758
 Nerita filosa Reeve, 1855
 † Nerita fortidentata Vermeij & Collins, 1988 
 Nerita fragum Reeve, 1855
 Nerita fulgurans Gmelin, 1791 - Antillean nerite
 Nerita fuliginata Reeve, 1855
 Nerita funiculata Menke, 1851
 Nerita gaimardii Souleyet, 1842 
 Nerita grasi Eichhorst, 2016
 Nerita grisea Reeve, 1855
 Nerita grossa Linnaeus, 1758
 Nerita guamensis Quoy & Gaimard, 1834
 Nerita helicinoides Reeve, 1855
 Nerita histrio Linnaeus, 1758
 Nerita incerta Von dem Busch in Philippi, 1844
 Nerita insculpta Récluz, 1841
 Nerita incurva E. von Martens, 1887
 Nerita japonica Dunker, 1860
 Nerita lianae T. Cossignani, 2019
 Nerita lirellata Rehder, 1980
 Nerita litterata Gmelin, 1791 
 Nerita longii Récluz, 1842
 Nerita luteonigra Dekker, 2000
 Nerita maculifera Le Guillou, 1841 
 Nerita magdalenae Gmelin, 1791
 Nerita maura Récluz, 1842
 Nerita maxima Gmelin, 1791
 Nerita melanotragus E.A. Smith, 1884
 † Nerita minor Sandberger, 1861 
 Nerita morio (G.B. Sowerby I, 1833)
  Nerita neritopsoides Reeve, 1855
 Nerita nigerrima Dillwyn, 1817
 Nerita nigrita Röding, 1798
 Nerita novaeguineae Lesson, 1831
 Nerita ocellata Le Guillou, 1841
 Nerita olivaria Le Guillou, 1841
 Nerita orbignyana Récluz, 1841
 Nerita oryzarum Récluz, 1841
 Nerita patula Récluz, 1841
 Nerita peloronta Linnaeus, 1758- bleeding tooth
 Nerita picea Récluz, 1841
 Nerita planospira Anton, 1839
 Nerita plicata Linnaeus, 1758
 Nerita polita Linnaeus, 1758
 Nerita quadricolor Gmelin, 1791
 Nerita quoyi Le Guillou, 1841 
 Nerita sanguinolenta Menke, 1829
 Nerita scabricosta Lamarck, 1822
 Nerita semirugosa Récluz, 1841
 Nerita senegalensis Gmelin, 1791
 Nerita signata Lamarck, 1822
 Nerita striata Burrow, 1815
 Nerita subgranosa Mabille, 1895 
 † Nerita symondsi Pacaud, 2017 
 Nerita tessellata Gmelin, 1791 - checkered nerite
 Nerita textilis Gmelin, 1791
 Nerita trifasciata Le Guillou, 1841
 Nerita umlaasiana Krauss, 1848
 Nerita undata Linnaeus, 1758 (forms a complex)
 Nerita undulata Gmelin, 1791
 Nerita versicolor Gmelin, 1791 - four-tooth nerite
 Nerita vexillum Reeve, 1855
 Nerita vitiensis Hombron & Jacquinot, 1848
 Nerita winteri Philippi, 1844
 Nerita yoldii Récluz, 1841

The Indo-Pacific Molluscan Database also includes the following species with names in current use 
 Nerita articulata Gould, 1847
 Nerita bicolor Récluz, 1843
 Nerita corrosula Récluz, 1842
 Nerita maxima Gmelin, 1791
 Nerita nigrita Röding, 1798
 Nerita panayensis Récluz, 1844
 Nerita pfeifferiana Récluz, 1843
 Nerita phasiana Récluz, 1842
 Nerita radiata Récluz, 1841
 Nerita sayana Récluz, 1844
 Nerita tenebrosa Récluz, 1842

Synonyms
 Nerita amoena (Gould, 1847): synonym of Neripteron amoenum (A. Gould, 1847) (unaccepted combination)
 Nerita amplisulcata Macsotay & Villarroel, 2001: synonym of Nerita versicolor Gmelin, 1791
 Nerita angularis Hombron & Jacquinot, 1854: synonym of Nerita (Ilynerita) planospira Anton, 1838
 Nerita annulata Reeve, 1855: synonym of Nerita (Argonerita) chamaeleon Linnaeus, 1758
 Nerita anthracina Von dem Busch, 1844: synonym of Nerita (Argonerita) ocellata Le Guillou, 1841
 Nerita arachnoidea Gmelin, 1791: synonym of Natica arachnoidea (Gmelin, 1791)
 Nerita arcta Hombron & Jacquinot, 1854: synonym of Nerita (Amphinerita) insculpta Récluz, 1841
 Nerita arriaca Röding, 1798: synonym of Nerita (Linnerita) polita Linnaeus, 1758
 Nerita asperulata Récluz, 1843: synonym of Neripteron asperulatum (Récluz, 1843) synonym of Neritina asperulata (Récluz, 1843) (original combination)
 Nerita atrata Gmelin, 1791: synonym of Euchelus atratus (Gmelin, 1791) 
 Nerita atrata Reeve, 1855: synonym of Nerita (Lisanerita) melanotragus E.A. Smith, 1884
 Nerita atropurpurea Récluz, 1841: synonym of Nerita (Ilynerita) planospira Anton, 1838
 Nerita australis Wood, 1828: synonym of Nerita (Linnerita) erythrostoma Eichhorst & Neville, 2004
 Nerita avellana Récluz, 1842: synonym of Clithon avellana (Récluz, 1842)
 Nerita bensoni Récluz, 1850: synonym of Puperita bensoni (Recluz, 1850) 
 Nerita bifasciata Gmelin, 1791: synonym of Nerita (Linnerita) polita Linnaeus, 1758
 Nerita birmanica Troschel, 1878 : synonym of Nerita balteata Reeve, 1855 (a junior synonym)
 Nerita bisecta Reeve, 1855: synonym of Nerita magdalenae Gmelin, 1791
 Nerita bizonalis Lamarck, 1816: synonym of Nerita (Argonerita) chamaeleon Linnaeus, 1758
 Nerita bizonalis Mörch (non Lamarck), 1852: synonym of Nerita (Ilynerita) planospira Anton, 1838
 Nerita bruguierei Récluz, 1841: synonym of Neritina pulligera (Linnaeus, 1767)
 Nerita candida W. Wood, 1825: synonym of Naticarius onca (Röding, 1798)
 Nerita carbonaria Philippi, 1845: synonym of Nerita (Lisanerita) morio (G.B. Sowerby I, 1833)
 Nerita chemnitzii Récluz, 1841: synonym of Nerita semirugosa Récluz, 1841
 Nerita chloroleuca Philippi, 1849: synonym of Nerita (Argonerita) chamaeleon Linnaeus, 1758
 Nerita chrysostoma Récluz, 1841: synonym of Nerita striata Burrow, 1815
 Nerita comma-notata Reeve, 1855: synonym of Nerita (Argonerita) aterrima Gmelin, 1791
 Nerita costata Brocchi, 1814: synonym of Clathrella clathrata (Philippi, 1844)
 Nerita dacostae Récluz, 1844: synonym of Clithon sowerbianum (Récluz, 1843)
 Nerita debilis Dufo, 1840 : synonym of Mienerita debilis (Dufo, 1840)
 Nerita doreyana Quoy & Gaimard, 1834: synonym of Nerita (Linnerita) litterata Gmelin, 1791, synonym of Nerita litterata Gmelin, 1791
 Nerita dubia Turton, 1932: synonym of Neritina auriculata Lamarck, 1816
 Nerita flammulata Récluz, 1841: synonym of Nerita undulata Gmelin, 1791
 Nerita flava Mörch, 1852: synonym of Nerita (Linnerita) litterata Gmelin, 1791
 Nerita flavescens Dillwyn, 1817: synonym of Nerita (Linnerita) polita Linnaeus, 1758
 Nerita forskali  Récluz, 1841: synonym of Nerita sanguinolenta Menke, 1829
 Nerita fulminea Gmelin, 1791: synonym of Natica fulminea (Gmelin, 1791)
 Nerita georgina Récluz, 1841: synonym of Nerita (Amphinerita) insculpta Récluz, 1841
 Nerita grayana Récluz, 1843: synonym of Nerita undulata Gmelin, 1791
 Nerita grayana Récluz, 1844: synonym of Nerita essingtoni Récluz, 1842
 Nerita haneti Récluz, 1841: synonym of Nerita (Lisanerita) morio (G.B. Sowerby I, 1833)
 Nerita hieroglyphica Dillwyn, 1817: synonym of Nerita (Linnerita) litterata Gmelin, 1791
 Nerita hilleana Dunker, 1871: synonym of Nerita (Amphinerita) insculpta Récluz, 1841
 Nerita hindsii Récluz, 1844 : synonym of Nerita (Argonerita) squamulata Le Guillou, 1841
 Nerita histrio Linnaeus, 1758 : synonym of Nerita (Argonerita) squamulata Le Guillou, 1841
 Nerita interrupta Récluz, 1843: synonym of Clithon faba (G. B. Sowerby I, 1836)
 Nerita intricata Donovan, 1804: synonym of Payraudeautia intricata (Donovan, 1804)
 Nerita islandica Gmelin, 1791: synonym of Amauropsis islandica (Gmelin, 1791)
 Nerita jovis Récluz, 1843: synonym of Vittina jovis (Récluz, 1843)
 Nerita junghuhni Schepman, 1901: synonym of Nerita (Amphinerita) olivaria Le Guillou, 1841
 Nerita laevilirata Sowerby, 1914: synonym of Nerita (Argonerita) chamaeleon Linnaeus, 1758
 Nerita larva Gmelin, 1791: synonym of Nerita (Linnerita) litterata Gmelin, 1791
 Nerita leucozonias Gmelin, 1791: synonym of Natica vitellus (Linnaeus, 1758)
 Nerita lineata Chemnitz, 1774 - lined nerite: synonym of Nerita balteata Reeve, 1855
 Nerita listeri Récluz, 1841: synonym of Nerita (Amphinerita) insculpta Récluz, 1841
 Nerita litoralis Turton, 1819: synonym of Littorina obtusata (Linnaeus, 1758)
 Nerita maculata Pease, 1867 : synonym of Nerita (Argonerita) argus Récluz, 1841
 Nerita mammilla Linnaeus, 1758: synonym of Polinices mammilla (Linnaeus, 1758)
 Nerita marinduquenensis Vallejo, 2000: synonym of Nerita patula Récluz, 1841
 Nerita marmorata Hombron & Jacquinot, 1854: synonym of Nerita (Argonerita) chamaeleon Linnaeus, 1758
 Nerita marochiensis Gmelin, 1791: synonym of Natica marochiensis (Gmelin, 1791)
 Nerita mascareignar Récluz, 1850: synonym of Nerita (Argonerita) aterrima Gmelin, 1791
 Nerita mauritiae Récluz, 1841: synonym of Nerita (Argonerita) aterrima Gmelin, 1791
 Nerita melanostoma Gmelin, 1791: synonym of Mammilla melanostoma (Gmelin, 1791)
 Nerita menkeana Récluz, 1842: synonym of Clithon olivaceum (Récluz, 1843)
 Nerita modesta Hombron & Jacquinot, 1854: synonym of Nerita (Argonerita) chamaeleon Linnaeus, 1758
 Nerita neritinoides Reeve, 1855: synonym of Nerita (Lisanerita) morio (G.B. Sowerby I, 1833)
 Nerita nigra Dillwyn, 1817: synonym of Nerita (Linnerita) polita Linnaeus, 1758
 Nerita nodosa Linnaeus, 1758: synonym of Thais (Thais) nodosa (Linnaeus, 1758)
 Nerita obscura Hombron & Jacquinot, 1854: synonym of Nerita (Argonerita) ocellata Le Guillou, 1841
 Nerita opaca Röding, 1798: synonym of Nerita (Linnerita) polita Linnaeus, 1758
 Nerita orbignyana Récluz, 1841: synonym of Nerita (Linnerita) litterata Gmelin, 1791
 Nerita orientalis Gmelin, 1791: synonym of Naticarius orientalis (Gmelin, 1791)
 Nerita pacifica Récluz, 1850: synonym of Nerita (Amphinerita) insculpta Récluz, 1841
 Nerita panayana Récluz, 1843: synonym of Nerita litterata Gmelin, 1791
 Nerita papilla Gmelin, 1791: synonym of Eunaticina papilla (Gmelin, 1791)
 Nerita pennata Born, 1778: synonym of Vittina pennata (Born, 1778)
 Nerita petechialis Mörch, 1852: synonym of Nerita (Argonerita) signata Lamarck, 1822
 Nerita pica Gould, 1859 : synonym of Nerita japonica Dunker, 1860
 Nerita picta Humphrey, 1797: synonym of Nerita (Linnerita) polita Linnaeus, 1758
 Nerita piscinalis O. F. Müller, 1774: synonym of Valvata piscinalis (O. F. Müller, 1774)
 Nerita plexa Dillwyn : synonym of Nerita textilis Gmelin, 1791
 Nerita punctata Quoy & Gaimard, 1834: synonym of Nerita (Argonerita) aterrima Gmelin, 1791
 Nerita pygmaea Martens, 1889: synonym of Nerita (Argonerita) signata Lamarck, 1822
 Nerita reticulata Karsten, 1789: synonym of Nerita (Argonerita) signata Lamarck, 1822
 Nerita rudis Wood, 1828: synonym of Nerita (Argonerita) signata Lamarck, 1822
 Nerita rufa Montagu, 1808: synonym of Lunatia montagui (Forbes, 1838)
 Nerita rufa Born, 1778: synonym of Natica vitellus (Linnaeus, 1758)
 Nerita rumphii Récluz, 1841: synonym of Nerita (Linnerita) litterata Gmelin, 1791
 Nerita rustica Nardo, 1847: synonym of Littorina saxatilis (Olivi, 1792)
 Nerita samoensis Dunker, 1869: synonym of Nerita (Argonerita) signata Lamarck, 1822
 Nerita saturata Hutton, 1884: synonym of Nerita (Lisanerita) melanotragus E.A. Smith, 1884
 Nerita scabrella Philippi, 1849: synonym of Nerita (Argonerita) chamaeleon Linnaeus, 1758
 Nerita schmeltziana Dunker, 1869: synonym of Nerita (Argonerita) argus Récluz, 1841
 Nerita souleyetana Récluz, 1842: synonym of Clithon souleyetanum (Récluz, 1842)
 Nerita spadicea (Gmelin, 1791): synonym of Natica spadicea (Gmelin, 1791)
 Nerita spengleriana Recluz, 1844: synonym of Nerita trifasciata Le Guillou, 1841
 Nerita squamulata Le Guillou, 1841: synonym of Nerita histrio Linnaeus, 1758 
 Nerita stella Dillwyn, 1817: synonym of Nerita (Argonerita) squamulata Le Guillou, 1841
 Nerita stercusmuscarum Gmelin, 1791: synonym of Natica stercusmuscarum (Gmelin, 1791)
 Nerita stricta Baird, 1873: synonym of Nerita (Amphinerita) insculpta Récluz, 1841
 Nerita succinea Récluz, 1841: synonym of Neritilia succinea (Récluz, 1841)
 Nerita tomlini Turton, 1933: synonym of Neritina auriculata Lamarck, 1816
 Nerita tristis Pilsbry, 1901: synonym of Nerita helicinoides var. tristis Pilsbry, 1901
 Nerita vitellus Linnaeus, 1758: synonym of Natica vitellus (Linnaeus, 1758)
 Nerita vitiensis Hombron & Jacquinot, 1854: synonym of Nerita (Linnerita) litterata Gmelin, 1791
 Nerita vittata Gmelin, 1791: synonym of Natica vittata (Gmelin, 1791)

References

Further reading 
 Récluz, C. 1841. Description de quelques nouvelles espèces de Nérites vivantes (2e partie, suite et fin). Revue Zoologique 4: 333-343
 Reeve, L. 1855. Monograph of the genus Nerita. Conchologia Iconica 9: pls. 1-19
 
 Tan K. S. & Lee S. S. C. (April 2009) "Neritid egg capsules: are they all that different?" Steenstrupia 30(2): 115–125. Copenhagen, Denmark. ISSN 0375-2909. PDF

Neritidae